The 1978 Green Bay Packers season was their 60th season overall and their 58th season in the National Football League. The team posted an 8–7–1 record under coach Bart Starr, earning them a second-place finish in the NFC Central division. This marked the first season the Packers were above .500 since 1972. The Packers got off to a 6–1 start. However, most of the wins came against weaker teams, and once the schedule toughened up the Packers struggled winning only one and tying one of their next six games. After a big win in Tampa Bay over the Buccaneers, the 8–5–1 Packers still had a shot at a NFC Central Title. However, the team would lose both of their final games, closing out with a 31–14 loss to the Los Angeles Rams and at 8–7–1 finished in a first-place tie with Minnesota. Since the Packers' record against the Vikings was 0–1–1 due to a 10–10 tie and a 7–21 loss, Green Bay missed the playoffs as the Eagles also leap-frogged the Packers for the final Wild Card spot, which the Packers would've still clinched at minimum regardless of the Vikings' result for the NFC Central.

Off-season

NFL draft 

 Green indicates future Pro Football Hall of Fame inductee

Undrafted free agents

Personnel

Roster

Regular season

Schedule 

Note: Intra-division opponents are in bold text.

Week 2 vs. New Orleans Saints 
Network: CBS
Announcers: Bill Mazer, Hank Stram, Nick Buoniconti
David Whitehurst fired four touchdown passes, three to rookie James Lofton on plays covering 42, 47 and 18 yards, and Terdell Middleton rushed for 114 yards to lead The Green Bay Packers to victory and a 2-0 start for the first time since 1969. Whitehurst a second-year quarterback, completing 10 of 15 passes for the young Packers. His other scoring pass was a nine-yarder to Rich McGeorge early in the fourth quarter.

Week 6 vs Bears

Week 8 at Vikings

Standings

Awards and records 
 Terrell Middleton, NFC leader in touchdowns

References

External links 
 1978 Green Bay Packers at Pro-Football-Reference.com

Green Bay Packers seasons
Green Bay Packers
Green